The Monmouth Rugby Football Club is a rugby union team in Division 1I of the Empire Geographical Union based in Monmouth County, New Jersey.

History
The Monmouth Rugby Football Club was founded as the Brookdale College Rugby Football Club in the Fall of 1973 by Doug Coil and Steve Barberio who were teachers at the college. Brookdale suffered as all young clubs do through several undistinguished seasons, even changing its colors several times as not to be recognized the next season! As the years passed, the club's players and leadership developed and the club eventually found itself playing in the Metropolitan Division I in the late 1970s.

The early 1980s saw some strong play by the now Monmouth Rugby Football Club and with some close loses to some perennially powerful clubs. In 1984, the team moved back to Division II and experienced some more tough seasons / years. The early 1990s brought the winning tradition back to Monmouth with a Jersey Cup championship and a return to Division I rugby. After some tough injuries and a few early retirements, the club suffered a couple of rough seasons. Since 1994, the club has shown its resilience by winning three of four second side Jersey Cup championships and has appeared in the National playoff picture 5 times in the past 10 years. The club has made the quarterfinals twice within the 5 appearances, both years suffering close losses to Snake River, Idaho.

After an undefeated season in 02', Monmouth was again brought up to Division I rugby in the Met Union. The club, coping with a declining membership and difficult scheduling, endured for three years on the Division I level. The prospect of the Super League and competing against a larger population base brought them back to Division II. During the 1990s Monmouth has won the Jersey Cup Tournament three times and placed second in the premier division in the Saranc Lake Tournament.

Monmouth Rugby Club has started the 2009 fall season by winning the Jersey Shore Tournament's Premier bracket with wins over Schuylkill River, Reading and New York Rugby Club. The 2009 fall season finished with Monmouth being beaten by Middlesex, MA in the semifinal of the Northeast Championships on Randall's Island, leaving Monmouth Ranked 4th in the Northeast.

Monmouth started the Fall 2010 season by winning their own invitational tournament, beating Princeton Athletic Club in the Final. Monmouth finished the Division 1 regular season 4 - 4. This put Monmouth in the NE crossovers against Boston Irish Wolfhounds who had just come down to D1 from SuperLeague. The step up was too much for Monmouth and they were well beaten by the Wolfhounds in Canton.

Spring 2011 has seen Monmouth recruit well and they are looking forward to a big fall season in Division 1.

Monmouth finished the 2011 Fall season as the #1 ranked team in MetUnion Division 1.

First XV Honors

Club Championships

Division 2 Metropolitan New York Rugby Union Champions - 2002
Division 1 Metropolitan New York Rugby Union #1 Rank - 2011
Division 2 (Empire GU) Champions- 2014
 WOMEN'S Division 2 (Empire GU) Champions -2017

Tournament Championships

Jersey Shore Tournament Champions - 2002, 2009, 2010
 Jersey Cup Tournament Champions - 2003, 2004, 2005
 Saranac Lake Can-Am Tournament - Club Division – 2nd Place 2004
Four Leafs Tournament Champions - 2009

Notable players
Note: caps and participation are accurate as of 23 April 2007

Rob Morello - best scrum half in the union, as well as 2001 Region 6 Wrestling Champion, 135 lbs.

USA Eagles

Past Eagles
Mike Liscovitz  (capped vs Canada 05/21/1977, England 10/15/1977, Canada 05/28/1978)
Nancy Breen     (capped vs Canada 09/03/1989)
Anne Barford

References

External links
 

University and college rugby union clubs in the United States
Rugby union teams in New York (state)